YBF may refer to:

 You've Been Framed, a British television programme
 Young Britons' Foundation, a British political organisation
 Bamfield Water Aerodrome, an airport in British Columbia, Canada